Markus Gasser (born 1967) is an Austrian literary scholar and author.

Life
Markus Gasser was born in Bregenz in 1967. After the gymnasium, he went to the University of Innsbruck for German, English and American studies. He attained a habilitation in 2007 with the thesis "The collapse of the platonic cave".

Markus Gasser lives in Zürich.

Works

References

External links
Markus Gasser's official website
Markus Gasser (Hanser Publications)

Austrian male writers
1967 births
Living people
21st-century Austrian writers
Austrian non-fiction writers
People from Bregenz
University of Innsbruck alumni
Australian literary critics
Male non-fiction writers